The 1971 Rothmans 3 Hour was motor race for Group E Series Production Touring Cars. It was staged at the Mount Panorama Circuit near Bathurst, in New South Wales, Australia on 12 April 1971. The race, which was Heat 1 of the 1971 Australian Manufacturers' Championship, was won by Allan Moffat driving a Ford Falcon GTHO.

Classes
As a heat of the 1971 Australian Manufacturers' Championship, classes were defined by a Capacity/Price Units formula with the value for each model calculated by multiplying the engine capacity in litres by the retail price.

 Class A : 0 to 3,000 CP units
 Class B : 3,001 to 4,600 CP units
 Class C : 4,601 to 9,000 CP units
 Class D : 9,001 to 18,000 CP units
 Class E : Over 18,000 CP units

Results

35 cars started the event and 14 failed to finish.

Allan Moffat recorded the fastest practice time (2:46.4) and the fastest race lap (2:46).

References

Rothmans 3 Hour
Motorsport in Bathurst, New South Wales